Ballinora GAA is a Gaelic Athletic Association club located in the townland of Ballinora, County Cork, Ireland. The club fields teams in both hurling and Gaelic football.

Honours

 Cork Intermediate Hurling Championship (1): 1932
 Cork Junior Football Championship (1): 1997
 Mid Cork Junior A Football Championship (3): 1990, 1996, 1997
 Mid Cork Junior A Hurling Championship  (7): 1928, 1929, 1982, 1996, 1997, 2016, 2021, 2022
 Cork Minor B Hurling Championship (1): 1992
 Cork Minor A Football Championship (2): 1987, 1998

External links
Ballinora GAA site

Gaelic games clubs in County Cork
Gaelic football clubs in County Cork
Hurling clubs in County Cork